Air Marshal Prithi Singh PVSM, AVSM, VM & Bar, ADC was an officer of the Indian Air Force. He served as Air Officer Commanding in Chief (AOC-in-C), Western Air Command from 1 August 1988  to 30 April 1992. During his 40 years in the Indian Air Force, Singh flew about 102 different types of aircraft and their 120+ versions setting a record in IAF of flying most number of aircraft.

Early life 
He was born into the Tanwar clan of Rajputs, with roots in the Bapora village in the Bhiwani district of Haryana. to Sakat Singh who was sarpanch of Bapora.

Career 
Air Marshal Pirthi Singh was commissioned in the Indian Air Force in 1953. During his distinguished service of 39 years, he has held important command and staff appointments such as Command of the Aircraft and System Testing Establishment, Director Offensive Operations, Director Training, Assistant Chief of the Air Staff (Operations), Deputy Chief of Air Staff at Air Headquarters and Air Officer Commanding-in-Chief Western Air Command. He is a graduate of National Defence College.

In 1960 Prithi was categorized a Cat A1 instructor by Reggie Upot and was posted to 17 Sqn at Poona on Hunters under the CO ‘Johnny’ Bhasin and Flt Cdr ‘Johny’ Greene both to become towering professionals in the IAF.

As a test pilot he held the rare distinct having carried out evaluation trials of all combat aircraft presently held in the Air Force Inventory. In 1979, he was appointed Commandant Aircraft System and Testing Establishment where he organized and participated in the testing and development of new equipment. He carried out these tasks successfully and without incurring a single incident involving loss or damage to any aircraft or equipment under development. As Commandant, he had shown extreme devotion and made outstanding contributions to aeronautical development in the country. Due to his initiative, dedication, hard work and foresight, the Test Pilot School at ASTE was rated very high.

As Deputy Chief of Air Staff, Air Marshal Singh continued to display qualities if extreme dedication and professional excellence. His acumen for planning and dear perception of the long term operational requirements of the Air Force was a strong contributory factor to finalization of some long term plans

Perhaps no other test pilot evaluated as many aircraft types as Prithi Singh to be considered for service in IAF. These included the Sukhoi Su-7, 160 of which type saw IAF service and flew over 1600 sorties in the 1971 War. He evaluated all new combat aircraft offered to IAF, including those for meeting the Deep Penetration Strike Aircraft (DPSA) requirement such as the Anglo-French Jaguar, French Mirage F1, British Buccaneer and the Swedish Viggen. By the time Air Marshal Prithi Singh finished his flying career in IAF, he had piloted around 120 aircraft types and their various versions, perhaps an unmatched IAF record. For his many remarkable contributions to IAF, flying over 6300 hours without a single avoidable accident and setting a shining example to younger officers. Of this he had flown almost 5200 hrs on single engine aircraft. In fact in the last month of his service career he flew 26 sorties and 51:15 hrs.

The Final Innings 
In Feb 2003 after exactly 50 years of military flying, Prithi flew the Czech, Aero Vodochody, Boeing L-159 at the Aero India 2003 air show at Yelahanka. It was a great opportunity for him to get back into the cockpit and joyously carry out aerobatics and spinning in an aircraft designed just for that. It was also a fitting celebration to mark his 50th anniversary of military flying. By this time he had piloted 105 types of aircraft.

Personal life 
He was married to Shiv Kanwar, daughter of Lt. Colonel Rai Bahadur Thakur Devi Singhji, last jagirdar of thikana Chittora of erstwhile Jaipur State. His son Air Marshal Vikram Singh is also a Test Pilot who had worked extensively on the Light Combat Aircraft. Prithi’s daughter is married to Air Marshal Sandeep Singh, Vice Chief of the Air Staff. Prithi Singh was a tea-totaller and non-smoker. He kept himself very fit and was hardly ever beaten at squash by youngsters even as the AOC-in-C Western Air Command

Honors and decorations 
During his career, Prithi Singh has been awarded the Param Vishist Seva Medal, Ati Vishisht Seva Medal, Vayu Sena Medal (BAR) for his service

Further reading 

 Service record of Air Marshal Prithi Singh
 The Man Who Flew Too Much - Part 1
 The Man Who Flew Too Much - Part 2

References 

1934 births
2012 deaths
Indian military personnel
Recipients of the Param Vishisht Seva Medal
Recipients of the Ati Vishisht Seva Medal
Recipients of the Vayu Sena Medal